Kaprin is a village in the Shopian district of Jammu and Kashmir. The people of the village are very religious. Islam is the religion mostly followed. It has been a hub of education from many decades. The town is empowered with the modern day amenities like banking and other public establishments. People are associated with the business of Apple and other fruits. The area has produced many Engineers, doctors, Lawyers and people from all other walks of life.

Geography

Kaprin Pin code is 192231 and postal head office is Kulgam .

Vehil (4 km), Shamshipora (5 km), Reshnagri (6 km), Amshipora (6 km), Ramnagri (5 km), Gagren (8 km) are the nearby Villages to Kaprin.

Anantnag, Srinagar, Rajauri, Poonch, Shopian district, Kulgam are the nearby Districts to Kaprin.

This place is in the border of the Shopian and Kulgam district.

Aharbal waterfall is a nearby major sightseeing destination.

Notable people
 Amin Kamil - Padma Shri awardee in 2005 for Literature and Education 
 Parvez Ahmad - Ex-Chairman & CEO Jammu and Kashmir Bank

References

External links
Pincode

Villages in Shopian district